San Pasquale  is an under construction metro station that will serve Line 6 on the Naples Metro.
The San Pasquale station, designed by the architect Boris Podrecca, will serve the areas of Via Caracciolo, the Villa Comunale (within which there is the Zoological Station Anton Dohrn) and the central part of the Chiaia district, and part of the San Ferdinand.
The railway complex will be built on the eastern edge of the Villa Comunale, in opposition to the previous line stop in Piazza della Repubblica, the west end. The previous station is Chiaia - Monte di Dio, the next is Arco Mirelli.

See also
Railway stations in Italy
List of Naples metro stations

Proposed Naples Metro stations
Railway stations in Italy opened in the 21st century